The 1993 World Weightlifting Championships were held in Melbourne, Australia from November 11 to November 21, 1993.

Medal summary

Men

Women

Medal table
Ranking by Big (Total result) medals 

Ranking by all medals: Big (Total result) and Small (Snatch and Clean & Jerk)

References
Results (Sport 123)
Weightlifting World Championships Seniors Statistics

External links
Database

W
World Weightlifting Championships
World Weightlifting Championships
Sports competitions in Melbourne
International weightlifting competitions hosted by Australia